United Nations Security Council Resolution 243, adopted unanimously on 12 December 1967, after examining the application of the People's Republic of Southern Yemen for membership in the United Nations, the Council recommended to the General Assembly that the People's Republic of Southern Yemen be admitted.

See also
List of United Nations Security Council Resolutions 201 to 300 (1965–1971)

References
Text of the Resolution at undocs.org

External links
 

 0243
 0243
1967 in South Yemen
 0243
December 1967 events